Indolin-2-one monooxygenase (BX3 (gene), CYP71C2 (gene)) is an enzyme with systematic name indolin-2-one,NAD(P)H:oxygen oxidoreductase (3-hydroxylating). This enzyme catalyses the following chemical reaction

 indolin-2-one + NAD(P)H + H+ + O2  3-hydroxyindolin-2-one + NAD(P)+ + H2O

Indolin-2-one monooxygenase is involved in the biosynthesis of protective and allelopathic benzoxazinoids in some plants.

References

External links 
 

EC 1.14.13